William Scarborough may refer to:

 William Scarborough (politician) (born c. 1945), member of the New York State Assembly
 William Harrison Scarborough (1812–1871), American painter
 William Sanders Scarborough (1852–1926), African American classical scholar
 William K. Scarborough, professor of history

See also
William Scarbrough, American sea captain